Turk Barrett is a fictional character appearing in American comic books published by Marvel Comics. The character is usually depicted in stories featuring Daredevil, in which his inept schemes are played as comic relief.

Barrett was a recurring character in the Marvel shows Daredevil, Jessica Jones, Luke Cage, Iron Fist, The Defenders, and The Punisher set in the Marvel Cinematic Universe, portrayed by Rob Morgan.

Publication history

Turk Barrett first appears in Daredevil #69 (Oct. 1970) and was created by writer Roy Thomas and artist Gene Colan.

Fictional character biography
Turk was a small-time crook operating in Hell's Kitchen, Manhattan. Roscoe Sweeney once sent Barrett to pay Jack Murdock to throw a boxing match. Barrett was associated with a street gang called the Thunderbolts. Barrett also worked for Eric Slaughter. Barrett once stole Mauler's armor from Aaron Soames to confront Daredevil, but he is defeated in seconds during their confrontation. Turk later stole Stilt-Man's armor, offering his services but the Kingpin declined to employ "idiots", and Wilbur Day contacted Daredevil with knowledge of how to defeat him. Turk has spent quite a bit of time at Josie's Bar in New York City. His criminal associate Grotto often reluctantly participates in Turk's schemes. Turk once mugged someone at Christmas and intended to use the Yuletide attire of Santa Claus to swindle charitable donations from others. In this instance, when he was confronted by Matt Murdock, Turk stabbed the disoriented Murdock seriously, almost fatally wounding Matt.

During the 2016 "Civil War II" storyline, Turk is with the Kingpin when they hear from the barista Armand that his girlfriend Sonia went missing. They track Sonia down to a human trafficking business that Man Mountain Marko and Janus Jardeesh (Kingpin's former minion) were working for.

During the 2018 "Infinity Countdown" storyline, Barrett found the Mind Gem and started using its powers for his own personal gain. While doing a ride-sharing scam as he's driving through Greenwich Village, Barrett stumbled upon a bunch of Skrulls attacking some monks that were delivering the Mind Infinity Gem to Doctor Strange at the Sanctum Sanctorum. Upon acquiring the Mind Gem during the fight, Turk begins to establish a criminal empire so that he can fill the void that was left when Kingpin left the criminal business. After briefly confronting Turk, Daredevil can somehow see again when in his presence. Turk uses the Mind Gem to get the judges to change their verdict on some criminals while gaining their loyalty and money. Daredevil caught wind of Barrett's goals and warned him about playing in the criminal big leagues. Doctor Strange later tracked down Barrett in order to get the Mind Gem from him only for Turk to evade the Sorcerer Supreme. He is among the Infinity Gem holders that are contacted by Doctor Strange who wants them to come together as the Infinity Watch to safeguard the Infinity Gems from such calamities including Thanos.

During the "Infinity Wars" storyline, Turk attends a meeting of the Infinity Watch in Central Park. He is accompanied by Bullseye, Sandman, Spot, Tombstone and Typhoid Mary. As the heroes are fighting Gamora's Requiem form, Doctor Strange takes Barrett to another dimension where Doctor Strange persuades Turk to hand the Mind Gem over.

Other versions
In the alternate timeline of the 2005 storyline "House of M", Turk Barrett is a member of Willis Stryker's gang. After Stryker was defeated, Turk willingly followed when Luke Cage took control of the group.

The Ultimate Marvel version of Turk Barrett is a gangster. A criminal acquaintance of Aaron Davis, he has Jefferson Davis as his main enforcer, eventually leaving his territory to Wilson Fisk's criminal empire.

During the Secret Wars storyline, two variations of Turk Barrett are seen in different Battleworld domains. The first one resides in the Battleworld domain of Technopolis and is a cowardly henchman of Kingpin. He accompanied the Kingpin to a meeting with the War Machine Deputies. When a fight ensued, Turk tried to make an excuse to leave the fight. The second one resides in the Battleworld domain of the Valley of Doom which is based from the remnants of Earth-51920 where every Marvel character is depicted in Wild West form. He is one of Mayor Wilson Fisk's minions. Barrett and the rest of Mayor Fisk's men attack Red Wolf when he tried to destroy Roxxon Dam. Upon being tipped off by Ben Urich, Sheriff Steve Rogers intervened and was able to put him in sheriff custody. Later that night, Mayor Fisk sent Turk and the other men to lure Sheriff Rogers out of the Sheriff Department so that they can kill Red Wolf. This plan didn't go well as Sheriff Rogers and Red Wolf were able to kill Turk and those involved in the attempt on Red Wolf's life.

In the "Old Man Logan" prequel "Old Man Hawkeye", Turk Barrett works as a bartender at Josie's Bar in Paste Pot Creek and is the uncle of Dwight. He is later killed by the Venom symbiote (possessing the Madrox Gang).

In other media
 Turk Barrett appeared in the TV film The Trial of the Incredible Hulk, played by Mark Acheson. This version is notably Caucasian instead of African-American.
 Turk Barrett is a recurring character across the Marvel's Netflix shows, portrayed by Rob Morgan. This version of the character is depicted as comic relief, always being subject to misfortunes whenever he appears:
 Turk first appears in Daredevil. In season one, he is an enforcer of Wilson Fisk, and is engaged in smuggling and arms dealing. A reputation for being shady, he's shown selling a gun to one of Fisk's assassins, only for the gun to jam for a hit despite Turk promising this would not be an issue and is stopped by Matt Murdock. After Fisk kills Anatoly Ranskahov for interrupting Fisk's date with Vanessa Marianna, James Wesley has Turk pass a message on to Vladimir Ranskahov to provoke into assembling men into individual locations where Fisk then proceeds to attack with suicide bombers. In season one's finale, Turk is among those who are arrested by the FBI for his association with Fisk's empire. In season two, Turk has made parole and is back to dealing guns. Daredevil crashes an arms deal between Turk and some enterprising crooks to get information on the Punisher's recent attack on Hell's Kitchen. In season two's finale, Turk is abducted by the Hand as part of Nobu Yoshioka's trap set for Daredevil and Elektra. He almost loses his foot after Karen Page activates his parole bracelet to alert the police, but Daredevil shows up and intervenes before that happens. 
 Turk next reappears in Luke Cage. In season one, he first appears when he's shown to occasionally visit Pop's Barbershop in Harlem to play chess with Bobby Fish. Detective Misty Knight is shown to be familiar with Turk's criminal activities when Misty and Rafael Scarfe cross paths with him on the sidewalk outside of the barbershop. Turk is indirectly responsible for kickstarting a gang war in Harlem, as he tips off Tone to Chico's presence at the barbershop. This causes Tone to shoot up the barbershop with twin submachine guns, wounding Chico and killing Pop. When Turk crashes a meeting Cottonmouth is having with Tone, Mariah Dillard and Shades Alvarez in order to ask Tone for the money promised, Cottonmouth kills Tone via throwing off the roof of Harlem's Paradise and then sends Turk off without his money. Turk doesn't appear again until he is seen doing business with Diamondback. He is established to be versed in Greek mythology as he has to explain to Zip what Diamondback means when describing his recent falling out with Shades as "Icarus crap". Later, Luke Cage tracks Turk down and traps him in a dumpster after scaring him into giving up Diamondback's warehouse. In season two, Turk is revealed to have opened up a marijuana shop. Luke and Danny Rand visit Turk at his shop and intimidate him into giving up the location of a warehouse operated by the Stylers working for Bushmaster who are growing his nightshade.
 Turk makes an appearance in The Defenders. Luke, seeking to help out a brother of the late Candace Miller as a favor for Misty, encounters Turk talking to an undercover police officer in a seedy Harlem bar known as Trouble in a Pair of Dice, and interrogates him for information on a recent string of murders that The Hand have been committing in Harlem. After some persuasion, he tells Luke that he has seen the dead men working with a new player (later revealed to be Sowande, one of the five Fingers that comprise The Hand's leadership) who has moved in since Diamondback was arrested, known on the streets as "White Hat" on account of clothing. Luke uses Turk's information and catches Sowande picking up a cleaning crew to destroy the bodies of Hand victims, and eventually crosses paths with Rand.
 Turk appears in The Punisher. In season one, Turk is targeted by Frank Castle, acting on intel from David Lieberman, to seek out guns, only to learn that Turk's shipments have dwindled aside from a pink Ruger Mini-14, due to most of it being sold to some Greek criminals. Frank settles for then pistol-whipping Turk unconscious instead of killing him, and is forced to crash a DHS sting operation to acquire guns. Barrett appears in season two. Despite having gone straight, Frank still recruits him into getting close with the Russians. He is found out and forced to lure Frank into a trap, though Castle sees it coming.
 Turk appears in Jessica Jones. In season two, Jeri Hogarth buys a revolver from Turk as part of revenge on Inez Green and con artist boyfriend Shane Ryback. It is also revealed that Turk is one of Jeri's clients and it is implied that Jeri got his criminal charges for his work with Fisk reduced.
 Turk appears in Iron Fist. In season two, Turk is seen selling guns to Ward Meachum and Mary Walker attempting to rescue Joy Meachum from Davos's captivity.

References

External links
Turk Barrett at Marvel Wiki
Turk Barrett at Comic Vine

Characters created by Gene Colan
Characters created by Roy Thomas
Comics characters introduced in 1970
Daredevil (Marvel Comics) characters
Fictional African-American people
Fictional characters from Manhattan
Fictional criminals
Marvel Comics characters
Marvel Comics male characters
Marvel Comics television characters